The results of the 2008 Little League World Series were determined between August 15 and August 24, 2008 in South Williamsport, Pennsylvania. 16 teams were divided into four groups, two with four teams from the United States and two with four international teams each, playing in a round robin format. In each group, the top two teams advanced to the knockout stage. The last remaining team from the United States faced the last remaining international team for the Little League World Series Championship.

Pool Play

Pool A

Maryland 3, Indiana 2

Louisiana 5, Washington 1

Louisiana 9, Indiana 0

Washington 15, Maryland 5

Washington 3, Indiana 2

Maryland 6, Louisiana 4

Pool B

Florida 10, South Dakota 0

Hawaii 3, Connecticut 1

Connecticut 9, South Dakota 4

Hawaii 10, Florida 2

Hawaii 6, South Dakota 4

Florida 8, Connecticut 2

Pool C

Mexico 6, Curaçao 2

Guam 7, Italy 6

Mexico 12, Italy 0

Mexico 10, Guam 0

Curaçao 14, Italy 1

Curaçao 3, Guam 0

Pool D

Venezuela 8, Canada 1

Japan 5, Saudi Arabia 0

Japan 9, Canada 3

Venezuela 12, Saudi Arabia 0

Japan 5, Venezuela 4

Canada 7, Saudi Arabia 5

Elimination round

International semifinals

Japan 11, Curaçao 4

Mexico 5, Venezuela 2

United States semifinals

Hawaii 9, Washington 4

Louisiana 6, Florida 1

International final

Mexico 5, Japan 4

United States final

Hawaii 7, Louisiana 5

Consolation Game

Japan 4, Louisiana 3

Championship Game

Hawaii 12, Mexico 3

External links
Full schedule from littleleague.org

2008 Little League World Series